The La Selle dusky frog or Mable's robber frog (Eleutherodactylus jugans) is a species of frog in the family Eleutherodactylidae. It is endemic to Hispaniola and known from the Massif de la Selle, both in the Dominican Republic and in Haiti. Its natural habitats are mesic pine and broadleaf forests. It is threatened by habitat loss. It is moderately common in suitable habitat, but threatened by habitat loss caused by logging and agriculture. It is known from both La Visite National Park (Haiti) and Sierra de Bahoruco National Park (Dominican Republic), but habitat degradation is occurring in these areas too.

References

jugans
Endemic fauna of Hispaniola
Amphibians of the Dominican Republic
Amphibians of Haiti
Amphibians described in 1937
Taxonomy articles created by Polbot